Upper Woodcott is a hamlet in the civil parish of Litchfield and Woodcott situated in the North Wessex Downs Area of Outstanding Natural Beauty in the Basingstoke and Deane district of Hampshire, England.

External links

Villages in Hampshire